Lora is a 2007 Hungarian drama film directed by Gábor Herendi.

References

External links 

2007 drama films
2007 films
Hungarian drama films
Films about interracial romance
2000s Hungarian-language films